Josh T. Jensen (born November 3, 1988) is an American politician serving as a member of the New York State Assembly from the 134th district. Elected in November 2020, he assumed office on January 6, 2021.

Early life and education 
Jensen was born in Rochester, New York, and graduated from Hilton High School in the suburb of Hilton. He earned a Bachelor of Arts degree in political science and history from Niagara University.

He has also volunteered with the Hilton Education Foundation and Rochester area chapter of the National Fallen Firefighters.

Career 
In 2008, Jensen worked as an intern in the White House Office of Strategic Initiatives. He was later a special assistant in the New York State Senate. In 2010, Jensen joined the staff of State Senator Joseph Robach, serving as his public policy advisor, director of community affairs, director of public affairs, and director of communications. In 2019 and 2020, he was the director of communications for the Monroe Community Hospital. He later served as a member of the Greece, New York Town Board, representing the town's third ward.

He was elected to the New York State Assembly in November 2020 and assumed office on January 6, 2021. He represents the 134th Assembly district, which includes the towns of Greece, Ogden, and Parma and the villages of Spencerport and Hilton in Monroe County.

In 2023, Jensen was named Ranking Member of the New York State Assembly Committee on Health, the highest position in a committee that can be held by a minority party member.

Committee assignments
As of January 2023, Jensen serves on the following committees in the New York State Assembly:
Health (as Ranking Member)
Corporations, Authorities & Commissions
Insurance*
Libraries & Education Technology Committee (Ranking member 2021-2022)

References 

Living people
People from Rochester, New York
Politicians from Rochester, New York
Niagara University alumni
Republican Party members of the New York State Assembly
1988 births